We Were Wolves is a 2014 Canadian feature film directed by Jordan Canning, co-written by Jordan Canning and Steve Cochrane, and starring Peter Mooney and Steve Cochrane as estranged brothers dealing with the fallout of their father's death. The film also stars Lynda Boyd, Dan Beirne and Melanie Scrofano.

The film premiered at the 2014 Toronto International Film Festival and is distributed by Video Services Corp.

References

External links 
 

2014 films
Canadian drama films
English-language Canadian films
Films directed by Jordan Canning
2010s English-language films
2010s Canadian films